Hellinsia glenni is a moth of the family Pterophoridae described by Everett D. Cashatt in 1972. It is found in North America, including Florida, Mississippi and California.

The larvae feed on Solidago canadensis. They are stemborers.

References

glenni
Moths of North America
Fauna of California
Moths described in 1972